Tegostoma moeschleri is a species of moth in the family Crambidae. It is found in Russia.

References

Moths described in 1862
Odontiini
Moths of Europe
Taxa named by Hugo Theodor Christoph